Ronnie Robinson may refer to:
 Ronnie Robinson (basketball) (1951–2004), American basketball player
 Ronnie Robinson (footballer) (born 1966), English former professional footballer
 Ronnie Robinson (roller derby) (1939–2001), American roller derby skater and coach

See also
Ronald Robinson (1920–1999), British historian
Ron Robinson (disambiguation)